Sint-Amandsberg is a sub-municipality of Ghent, Belgium. The municipality was formed in 1872 after splitting from Oostakker.

It is served by the Bus and train station of Gent Dampoort on the Ghent Antwerp NMBS/SNCB line.

During the First World War, on 7 June 1915, the German airschip LZ37 crashed after being destroyed by Reginald Warneford. A street was named Reginald Warnefordstraat on the spot where the airship crashed.

Campo Santo 
In the Center is the famous Campo Santo (Gent), a Catholic burial site. The chapel on the hill was erected by Philips Erard van der Noot.

References

External links

Sub-municipalities of Ghent
Populated places in East Flanders